Jean-Baptiste-Arthur Angrignon (March 2, 1875 – 1948) was a Canadian politician and a city councillor in Montreal, Quebec.

Background

The son of Delphis Angrignon and Flavie Dufresne, he was born on March 2, 1875, in St-Placide, Quebec, grew up in the Deux-Montagnes, Basses-Laurentides area and was a merchant. In 1902, he married Marie-Elisabeth Skelly. He came to Montreal in 1915.

City Councillor

In 1921, he was elected to the City Council of Montreal for the district of Saint-Paul.  He was re-elected in 1924, 1926, 1928, 1930 and 1932.  From 1930 to 1932, Angrignon was a Member of Montreal Executive Committee from 1928 to 1930.  He oversaw the development of Angrignon Park on land that belonged to the Crawford family.

He did not run for re-election in 1934.

Retirement

Angrignon died in Montreal in 1948.

Honors

The following Montreal landmarks were named to honor Jean-Baptiste Angrignon:
 Angrignon Park (named after him in 1927);
 Angrignon Metro station (completed in 1978);
 Carrefour Angrignon shopping mall (built in 1986).
 Boulevard Angrignon (named in 1993)

Footnotes

External links
City of Montreal

Angrignon, Jean-Baptiste
Angrignon, Jean-Baptiste
Angrignon, Jean-Baptiste